Dasyscyphella is a genus of fungi within the Hyaloscyphaceae family. The genus contains 23 species.

References

External links
Dasyscyphella at Index Fungorum

Hyaloscyphaceae